José María Angél González was the governor of the independent Junta Popular during New Mexico’s Río Arriba Rebellion in 1837. González, sometimes spelled Gonzáles, was a Taos Pueblo Indian who led the Junta Popular or Cantón, which was the most ethnically inclusive government in the history of New Mexico. González was quickly replaced by Montoya as Cantón Governor. González was the first and only Pueblo elected Governor of New Mexico.

José María González was from Chimayó and was an accomplished buffalo hunter. González was illiterate and his democratic election marks the only time New Mexico elected an Indian to the governorship. González was likely born a Genízaro father and Taos Pueblo mother, although his exact background is still debated by scholars, who compared his groundbreaking position to Benito Juárez a generation later. He replaced unpopular Mexican governor Albino Pérez before his replacement by Montoya. Both González and Pérez were killed during the rebellion, but Montoya would survive to lead the Taos Revolt ten years later. The revolt underlined how increased isolation from Mexico City combined with "Mexico's declarations of political equality for all ethnic groups" increased Pueblo and Hispano cooperation in Mexican New Mexico—"the two groups ousted the governor and briefly established an Independent state—the Cantón—with an Indian serving as its governor.

Governor of New Mexico 
When José González became Governor he floated a plan to invite foreigners to join the rebellion and annex New Mexico to the United States in return for support of the rebellion. This proposal weakened his support. The Taos Priest Antonio José Martínez was sympathetic to the revolt. Despite military superiority, the revolt failed when Pablo Montoya of Taos turned in González in return for amnesty for his faction.

References 

1838 deaths
Governors of New Mexico
19th-century Mexican politicians
Bison hunters